Galanin-like peptide (GALP) is a neuropeptide present in humans and other mammals. It is a 60-amino acid polypeptide produced in the arcuate nucleus of the hypothalamus and the posterior pituitary gland. It is involved in the regulation of appetite and may also have other roles such as in inflammation, sex behavior, and stress.

Notes

Neuropeptides